Munkhtsetseg Jalkhaajav (Mongolian: Жалхаажавын Мөнхцэцэг) also known as Mugi, is one of the leading contemporary artists of Mongolia. Her interdisciplinary works incorporate paintings, sculptures, collages, performance and media art.

Early life and career 
Munkhtsetseg was born in 1967 in Ulaanbaatar, Mongolia. She graduated from the Fine Arts College, Ulaanbaatar in 1987. Between 1989-1994, she studied at the Academy of Fine Arts and Minsk Theater. However, she chose not to graduate because she was unsatisfied with the curriculum under the socialist regime. 

Her 2015 solo show titled Reincarnation was held as part of the international exhibition held in conjunction with the La Biennale di Venezia. 

In 2022, it was announced that she will represent Mongolia at the 59th International Art Exhibition of La Biennale di Venezia with her exhibition titled A Journey Through Vulnerability.  

Munkhtsetseg is married to Erdenebayar Monkhor, a Mongolian painter and sculptor. They have a son together, Jantsankhorol Erdenebayar, who is also an artist.

Notable exhibitions

Solo exhibitions 
2012     Earthbound, at Schoeni Art Gallery, Hong Kong
2015     Reincarnation - Personal Structures, Palazzo Bembo, Venice, Italy
2019     Inside Passage or A Journey Through Vulnerability, Art Space 976+, Ulaanbaatar, Mongolia
2022     A Journey Through Vulnerability, Mongolia Pavilion at the 59th International Art Exhibition of La Biennale di Venezia

Group exhibitions 
2005     2nd Beijing International Art Biennale, Beijing, China
2008     3rd Beijing International Art Biennale, Beijing, China
2012     Urban Narratives – New Contemporary Mongolian Art, Schoeni Art Gallery, Hong Kong
2012    Women In-Between: Asian Women Artists 1984-2012, at Fukuoka Asian and Mie Prefectural Art Museums, Japan
2013     Spirits of the Steppe, at Luxe Art Museum, Singapore
2017     Beyond Heaven and Earth: Mongolian Art In This Day and Age, at China Art Museum, Shanghai, China
2018     Speaking Lights and Shadows, at Art Space 976+, Ulaanbaatar, Mongolia

References

External links 

 http://www.artbayarmugi.com/mugi
 http://www.mongolian-art.de/04_kuenstler/10_artist_munkhtsetseg_javkhaajav.html
 https://976artgallery.com/munkhtsetseg-jalkhaajav/
https://vimeo.com/128013461

1967 births
Living people
Mongolian artists